The 2022 Argentine Primera Nacional, also known as the Campeonato de Primera Nacional Torneo Malvinas Argentinas 2022, was the 38th season of the Primera Nacional, the second tier competition of Argentine football. The season began on 11 February and ended on 19 November 2022. Thirty-seven teams competed in the league, thirty-three returning from the 2021 season, two teams promoted from Torneo Federal A and two from Primera B Metropolitana.

Belgrano were the champions, clinching direct promotion as well as their first title in the competition with two matches in hand and a 3–2 victory over Brown (A) on 25 September 2022. Instituto were the other promoted team, winning the Torneo Reducido after defeating Estudiantes (BA) in the final.

Format
Thirty-seven teams played each other once for a total of thirty-six rounds. The top-placed team was the champion and also earned promotion to the Primera División. The teams placed from second to thirteenth place competed in the "Torneo Reducido" for the second promotion berth after the regular season ended, with the team placed second entering in the third round, the team placed third entering in the second round and the remaining teams entering in the first round. The bottom two teams were relegated at the end of the season, as relegation was reinstated after being suspended for two years due to the COVID-19 pandemic.

The draw to decide the fixture of the season was held on 13 January 2022 at the Argentine Football Association's Ezeiza offices.

Club information

Stadia and locations

League table

Results

Torneo Reducido
Teams ending in positions 2 to 13 played the Torneo Reducido for the second and last promotion berth to Primera División, in which teams were seeded in each round according to their final placement in the first stage of the tournament. The first two rounds were played over a single leg, at the stadium of the higher-seeded team. The semi-finals and finals were played over two legs, with the higher-seeded team hosting the second leg. In all rounds, the higher-seeded team advanced in case of a tie.

First round

Second round

Semi-finals

|}

First leg

Second leg

Finals
The winners of this double-legged series were the second team promoted to Primera División.

Tied 1–1 on aggregate, Instituto won on having a better season record.

Season statistics

Top scorers
{| class="wikitable" style="text-align:center"
|-
!Rank
!Player
!Club
!Goals
|-
|1
|align="left"| Pablo Vegetti
|align="left"|Belgrano
|17
|-
|2
|align="left"| Octavio Bianchi
|align="left"|All Boys
|15
|-
|rowspan=3|3
|align="left"| Luis Silba
|align="left"|Estudiantes (RC)
|rowspan=3|14
|-
|align="left"| Matías Giménez
|align="left"|San Martín (SJ)
|-
|align="left"| Braian Oyola
|align="left"|Tristán Suárez
|-
|rowspan=5|6
|align="left"| Nicolás Servetto
|align="left"|Almagro
|rowspan=5|13
|-
|align="left"| Claudio Bieler
|align="left"|Atlético de Rafaela
|-
|align="left"| Mateo Acosta
|align="left"|Brown (A)
|-
|align="left"| Enzo Díaz
|align="left"|Ferro Carril Oeste
|-
|align="left"| Gabriel Graciani
|align="left"|Instituto
|}

See also
 2022 Argentine Primera División
 2022 Torneo Federal A
 2021–22 Copa Argentina

References

External links
 Ascenso del Interior  
 Interior Futbolero 
 Promiedos  

Primera B Nacional seasons
2022 in Argentine football